Wander AG (officially: "WANDER AG") is a food producer that is owned by Associated British Foods and is based in Neuenegg (Canton of Bern, Switzerland). The company employs about 300 people in Switzerland. Its most well-known product is Ovomaltine and Isostar.

History

In 1865 Georg Wander opened a "chemical-technical and analytical" laboratory in the old town of Bern. His son Albert Wander, took over the company in 1897. In 1904, the production of the malt beverage Ovomaltine was started. The first sales depots opened in Italy and England only two years later. In 1908 the sole proprietorship was converted into a stock corporation. In 1913, the first Ovomaltine production facility outside of Switzerland was built in Kings Langley (Great Britain). In 1927 the Swiss production site was moved from Bern to Neuenegg. In 1997, a new Ovomaltine production plant was opened in Neuenegg, which has been responsible for pan-European production since 2002.

Wander AG was taken over by Sandoz in 1967 and sold to Associated British Foods in 2002.

Products
In addition to Ovomaltine products, Wander AG also manufactures the first isotonic drink on the market, Isostar, as well as the chocolate beverage powder Caotina, the nutritional supplement Jemalt and protein bars for endurance sports.

Literature
Walter Thut:  Vom Zwei-Mann-Labor zum Weltkonzern. Georg Wander (1841-1897), Albert Wander (1867-1950), Georg Wander (1898-1969). Association for Economic History Studies, Zurich 2005,  (Swiss pioneers of business and technology. Vol. 79).

Website
Wander Wander AG website
w Walter Thut: Wander AG. In: Historical Lexicon of Switzerland. In: Historical Dictionary of Switzerland

References

Food and drink companies established in 1865
Food and drink companies of Switzerland
Multinational companies headquartered in Switzerland
Drink brands
Associated British Foods